John Parkin is a well-known presenter of US infomercials.

Originally from Newcastle-upon-Tyne, UK, he was working as a successful department store salesman when he was offered a job by US informercial producers who were unable to find a suitable American presenter.

Since the 1980s he has presented the well-known Amazing Discoveries infomercial series among others, selling products such as the Turbo Cooker, Royal Diamond Cookware and the Rocket Chef food processor.

Parkin's 'trademarks' include red braces, bowtie, and an energetic presentation style.

External links
Biography page on IMDB
BBC Radio 4 In Business, 8 Sept 2005 (on which Parkin was interviewed)

Living people
Year of birth missing (living people)